Věž is a municipality and village in Havlíčkův Brod District in the Vysočina Region of the Czech Republic. It has about 800 inhabitants.

Administrative parts
Villages of Jedouchov, Leština, Mozerov and Skála are administrative parts of Věž.

References

Villages in Havlíčkův Brod District